Lo que callamos las mujeres (English: What We Women Keep Silent), is a Mexican anthology television series which deals with the social problems of Mexican society. The show started airing on the Mexican television network Azteca 13 as a way to compete with Canal de las Estrellas' Mujer, casos de la vida real. It started airing on the network in 2000 and has run continuously since then.
The series continues to be one of the most popular programs on said television station and is currently being broadcast with great acceptance. Some of the most important theater, film and television actors have paraded in its cast.
One if it's stars is actress Angélica Magaña.

Background
The show presents the individual dramatizations of stories sent in by actual women in Mexico, each episode revolves around a specific topic or issue which usually is resolved in the end. As the title leads, the show was created with the principal to present and make known the issues and problems that women in Mexican society 'Silence' (Hence the name: What We Women Silence), or in other words, make the issues that are not accepted in society known. Episodes have involved themes such as:

Jealousy;
Family violence;
Violence in general;
Suicide;
Children living on the streets;
Unwanted pregnancies;
Juvenile delinquency;
Narcotics;
Child pornography or pornography in General;
AIDS;
Alcoholism;
age disparities in sexual relationships;
Corruption or Exploitation;
Unjust firings;
Diabetes;
Male infertility;
Post-traumatic stress disorder;
Child abuse by part of a teacher or parent;
Child abuse in general;
Bed wetting;
Divorce;
Child abductions;
Child prostitution or prostitution in General;
Adolescent pressures;
Adoption;
Breast cancer;
Incest;
Rape;
Murder;
Hatred;
Revenge;
Immigration problems or issues.

At the end of each episode, a list of centres and help agencies is presented to help other women who are suffering with the same problem, along with an inspirational poem which pertains to the theme used in the day's episode which instructs the viewer to "Break Their Silence".

"Breaking Our Silence" became the show's tagline as of 2005, in conjunction with the show's fifth anniversary advertising campaign in which the show's recurring actresses appeared during each commercial break saying "It's now been five years of breaking our silence, easier than you thought. No?"

Controversy
As expected, after the show's premiere, Silvia Pinal, the host of Mujer, casos de la vida real, blasted the show, claiming that it was nothing but a complete copy of her program.

Production
Executive Producers
Genoveva Martínez
Ma. Eva Hernández
Ademir González Cancino
Associate Producer
Norma Ruiz Esparza

Directors
Angélica Aragón
Alberto Cervantes
Carlos Guerra
Carlos Villegas
Emmanuel Duprez
Hildebrando Carballido
Néxtor Galván
Ricardo Ruiz
Foundations Coordination
Adriana Hammeken

Supevisora Literaria
Eugenia Bonfil

Casting
Blanca Alicia Brera

Post Production
Carlos Olivares,
Sergio Ojeda

Cast
 Martha Mariana Castro
 Saskia Seligman
 Nathalia Aragonese.
 Gabriela de la Garza

Movimiento Azteca Conjunction
The show has also been known for being in conjunction with the TV Azteca organizational movement 'Movimiento Azteca which uses TV Azteca's airwaves and this program specifically to help generate interest in fundraisers for various charitable 'Movements.' Usually TV Azteca produces a special episode in some way related to the movement to aid in generating a more humanly understanding of a movement. Some movements that Moveimiento Azteca has presented using Lo Que Callamos Las Mujeres are: helping street children, helping burned children, helping abandoned seniors, and most recently helping endangered whales in Mexico.

References

Azteca Uno original programming
2000 Mexican television series debuts
Television series by TV Azteca
Mexican anthology television series